Mohsin Fani was a noted Persian historian from Iran. Some suggest he is the author of Dabistan-E-Mazahib.

Life & works 

Born around 1615 in Iran, Mohsin Fani was once migrated to India, for the study of the religions there, in the time of the sixth Sikh guru, Guru Hargobind Sahib with whom he had friendly relationships. Bhai Kahn Singh Nabha gave some references to him and his (Fani's) book Dabistan-E-Mazahib to claim his point on Sikhs not following Hindu rituals in Ham Hindu Nahin.

See also 
Kahn Singh Nabha

References 

17th-century Iranian historians
Iranian historians of religion